{{DISPLAYTITLE:Mu2 Scorpii}}

Mu² Scorpii (μ² Scorpii, abbreviated Mu² Sco, μ² Sco), also named Pipirima , is a star in the zodiac constellation of Scorpius. It has an apparent visual magnitude of +3.56, which is bright enough to be seen with the naked eye. Its distance from the Sun is about 474 light-years, as determined by parallax measurements. It is a member of the Upper Centaurus–Lupus subgroup of the Scorpius–Centaurus association.

Properties 

This is a blue-white, B-type subgiant star with a stellar classification of B2 IV. It has an estimated 7 times the radius of the Sun, almost 9 times the Sun's mass, and shines with 2,385 times the Sun's luminosity. The outer atmosphere has an effective temperature of 23,113 K. It is some 18.5 million years old and is spinning with a projected rotational velocity of 58 km/s.

Nomenclature 

μ² Scorpii (Latinised to Mu² Scorpii) is the star's Bayer designation.

In Tahiti, a traditional story is told of a brother and sister, named Pipiri and Rehua, who flee their parents into the sky and become stars. Their parents call them Pipiri ma while chasing them into the sky: ma "with, and" is used after names to mean "et al." In one account, the children become Shaula and Lesath in the tip of the tail of Scorpio, and in another they become Mu² and Mu¹ Scorpii. (In a similar version of the story told in the Cook Islands, they become Omega¹ and Omega² Scorpii).

In 2016, the IAU organized a Working Group on Star Names (WGSN) to catalog and standardize proper names for stars. The WGSN approved the name Pipirima for this star on 5 September 2017 (along with Xamidimura for its partner) and it is now so included in the List of IAU-approved Star Names.

In Chinese astronomy, Mu² Scorpii is called 尾宿增二.

Planetary system
Two sub-stellar objects slightly above deuterium burning limit (brown dwarfs) were found in 2022 by direct imaging near Mu2 Scorpii. The outer one, designated Mu2 Scorpii b, is definitely an orbiting planet or brown dwarf, and the inner one is a planetary candidate.

References

External links
The beautiful maidens from the Once, Upon a Reef, on: Facebook, Cook Islands Dance Video's

Scorpii, Mu2
B-type subgiants
Scorpius (constellation)
151985
082545
6252
Upper Centaurus Lupus
Durchmusterung objects
Pipirima
Planetary systems with one confirmed planet